Parvathy is an Indian playback singer from Kerala, India.

Family
Parvathy is the daughter of Jayadevan and Sindhulatha. She was born to a Malayali family in Mallappuram, Kerala. Her parents, both Mr. Jayadevan and Sindhulatha, work as Ayurvedic doctors in Kerala.

TV shows
As a child, she won the children's special reality show Super Star Junior 2 title in 2008–2009 on the Amrita TV channel.

In 2013–2014, she participated in Vijay TV's Airtel Super Singer 4, and ended being one of the top five finalists of the season.

Career

Playback singing
Parvathy made her debut in Indian playback singing with the Tamil song "Kannadi Poopole .." for the movie Anba azhaga music composed by Arrol Corelli in Tamil, released in 2013 . She has also sung songs for some Tamil and Malayalam movies. She have sung a Malayalam song called "Aye kochu kalla" from the movie "Pradhinayagan"  (Malayalam version of Kaaviya Thalaivan ) which is music composed by A.R Rahman .

Songs

Notes

References

2.^Njan Steve Lopez

Malayalam playback singers
Indian women playback singers
People from Malappuram
Living people
Year of birth missing (living people)
Singers from Kerala
Film musicians from Kerala
21st-century Indian singers
21st-century Indian women singers
Women musicians from Kerala